The Australian cricket team toured Pakistan in the 1988–89 season. The teams played three 5-day Tests and 3 ODI's. Pakistan won both series 1 - 0. Javed Miandad and Bruce Reid were declared Man of the Series.

Australian squad
The Australian squad selected was as follows:
Batsmen - David Boon, Allan Border (c), Dean Jones, Geoff Marsh, Jamie Siddons, Mike Veletta, Steve Waugh, Graeme Wood
Fast/medium bowlers - Tony Dodemaide, Craig McDermott, Bruce Reid
Wicketkeeper - Ian Healy
Spinners - Tim May, Peter Sleep, Peter Taylor

Test series

1st Test

In the first Test, Javed Miandad scored 211, while Iqbal Qasim took 9 wickets.

2nd Test

In the second Test, Ijaz Ahmed and Javed Miandad scored 122 and 107 for Pakistan, while Allan Border scored 113 for Australia.

3rd Test

In the third match, Javed Miandad became the first batsman for Pakistan to score 7,000 runs in Tests. It was also the only time that Steve Waugh opened the bowling in each innings in a Test.

ODI series

Pakistan won the ODI series 1–0. The first match, scheduled for 30 September 1988, at the Jinnah Stadium in Gujranwala was abandoned due to the ground flooding. The second match, originally scheduled to be played at the National Stadium in Karachi on 14 October 1988, and the third one-day match, scheduled to be played at Niaz Stadium in Hyderabad on 15 October 1988, were both abandoned as well due to riots. As a result, the scheduled rest day of the Lahore Test was cancelled and a one-day international scheduled for 13 October for Gaddafi Stadium in Lahore. That match as then played a day later.

The only one day match to be played resulted in a tied game, with both teams scoring 229 in the 45 over match. However, since Australia lost 1 more wickets (8 to 7), Pakistan was declared winners of the match.

For more information regarding the riots, see Hyderabad riots of 1988

Tour Matches

Australia also played three 3-day first class tour matches against BCCP Patron's XI at the Gaddafi Stadium in Lahore on 5 September 1988, Baluchistan Governor's XI at the Ayub National Stadium in Quetta on 9 September 1988 and against North West Frontier Province Governor's XI at the Arbab Niaz Stadium in Peshawar on 2 October 1988.

All three matches were drawn.

External sources
CricketArchive

References

 Playfair Cricket Annual
 Wisden Cricketers Almanack (annual)

1988 in Australian cricket
1988 in Pakistani cricket
1988-89
Pakistani cricket seasons from 1970–71 to 1999–2000
International cricket competitions from 1988–89 to 1991